Ektelon, Inc. is an American manufacturer of equipment for racquetball.

Originally based in Bordentown, New Jersey, Ektelon was founded by Franklin W. "Bud" Held in 1964 as the first company to manufacture racquetball racquets and stringing machines, not long after the development of the sport of racquetball by Joe Sobek.  Working from Held’s garage in San Diego, California, the company initially set out to build  aluminum tennis racquets and a racquet stringing machine.  With the development of metal tennis racquets, the old techniques of stringing wooden racquets no longer worked, and Held saw the need for a new machine.  Held is credited for one of the first patented designs for a racquet stringing machine.  He named the company Ektelon based on a combination of two Greek words: "ektein", meaning to stretch out, and "telon", representing the concept of perfection.

In 1970, Ektelon produced the first experimental racquetball racquet for Bud Muehleisen, a top racquetball player and early legend of the sport.  The company moved into a larger facility in San Diego to begin manufacturing racquetball racquets on a larger scale.  Over the years, Ektelon has introduced a number of new racquetball technologies, including the first racquetball racquet made of high-strength aluminum (1971), the first handlaid composite racquet (1978), the first oversized aluminum racquets (1984), and continues to develop new technologies in racquet design such as the elimination of string holes (O3).  In 1988, Prince Sports purchased Ektelon and the brand remained prominent among racquetball equipment manufacturers for several decades thereafter.

As a subsidiary of Prince Sports, Ektelon changed ownership and management multiple times before disappearing among the holdings of Authentic Brands Group in 2012. As late as 2015, the Ektelon brand name was referenced as an ABG property, but all manufacturing had ceased, with existing inventory disposed and player programs discontinued by the following year. A Restrung Magazine annual re-cap in 2016 detailed The Quiet Death of Ektelon with added insights, and the company website later went dark.

Ektelon involvement in racquetball tournaments
Ektelon sponsors numerous tournaments and tours nationally and internationally, including:

 US Racquetball Association
 National Intercollegiate Championships
 National Doubles Championships
 National Singles Championships
 Racquetball World Championships
 World Outdoor Racquetball (WOR) Championships 
 International Racquetball Tour
 International Racquetball Federation
 Classic Professional Racquetball Tour
 Racquet for the Cure
 Women's Professional Racquetball Organization

Professional Ektelon Players (International Racquetball Tour - IRT) 
Current World Top 100 IRT Professionals

  Jose Rojas
  Jansen Allen
  Charlie Pratt
  Adam Manilla
  Andy Hawthorne
  Farshid Guilak
  Dylan Reid
  Ryan Maher
  Marco Bertarelli

Team Ektelon Players

  Nick Montalbano
  Ricky Diaz 
  Richard Aal
  Anthony Wong
 Bill Gorge
  Michael Baker
  Yee Cheng
  Steve Cook
  Woody Clouse
  Alex Ackerman
  Ruben Gonzalez

Ladies Professional Racquetball Tour (LPRT) Players
  Rhonda Rajsich
  Veronica Sotomayor
  Michelle Key
  Jessica Parrilla

Outdoor Pros (WOR) Players
  Craig Clubber Lane
  Scott Davis
  Bill Gorge
  Andy Hawthorne
  Gary Martin
  Son Nguyen
  Mike Orr
  Jose Rojas
  Rick Sandello
  Robert Sostre
  Jesus Ustarroz
  Dillon Silver
  Greg Solis
  Veronica Sotomayor
  Tracy Hawthorne
  Kris Kaskawal
  Michelle Key
  Aubrey O'Brien

Junior Elite Players
  James D'Ambrogia
  Justus Benson
  Lily Berry
  Sam Bredenbeck
 Daniel Rojas
  Dane Elkins
  Sebastian Fernandez
  Alexis Iwaasa
  Ben Jenkel
  Jonathan Lanford
  Victoria Leon
  Sawyer Lloyd
  Heather Mahoney
  Adam Manilla
  Erika Manilla
  Devon Pimentelli
  Sam Reid
  Chase Robison
  Ricky Diaz
  Kaitlyn Simmons
  Samantha Simmons
  Julian Singh

References

External links
 Ektelon site
 World Outdoor Racquetball (WOR)
 Ektelon Racquetball Shop
ReStrung Magazine 2016 Top-Ten List
US Racquetball Museum, History of Ektelon Racquet Frames

Sporting goods manufacturers of the United States
Companies based in Burlington County, New Jersey
Manufacturing companies established in 1964
Racquetball
1964 establishments in New Jersey